Honingham is a village and civil parish in the English county of Norfolk, located  to the west of Norwich along the A47 trunk road.
For the purposes of local government, it falls within the district of Broadland. Honingham Hall was demolished in 1966.

The villages name means 'homestead/village of Huna's people'.

Notable people 
Kenneth Mayhew, RMWO, World War II veteran, decorated with the highest honour of the Kingdom of the Netherlands
Sir Eric Teichman, British diplomat and orientalist, resident at Honingham Hall at the time of his death and was buried in the churchyard.

Notes 

 http://kepn.nottingham.ac.uk/map/place/Norfolk/Honingham

External links

 
Villages in Norfolk
Civil parishes in Norfolk
Broadland